The Polygon (or simply Polygon) is an area in the city of Southampton, England.

The area is located north of the Western Esplanade, Commercial Road and Cumberland Place; east of Hill Lane and Rollesbrook Greenway; south of Archers Road; and west of Dorset street and The Avenue (A33). The area notably encompass Watts Park, Southampton Central railway station, Southampton Courts of Justice and the Maritime & Coastguard Agency. The residential area consists of largely Edwardian red brick houses.

History 
The name originates from a planned grand  development in this area – a twelve-sided polygon that would comprise houses, hotels, assembly rooms and a tavern. The design was the brainchild of architect Jacob Leroux, who saw it as Southampton's answer to Bath's Royal Crescent. Construction began in 1768, but only the hotel and three houses were completed when one of the investors went bankrupt and the project stalled. The hotel opened in 1773, although it did not do very good business.

In the Victorian era, many more houses, typical of the time, were built on the surrounding land, forming the area and buildings known as The Polygon today.

The original Polygon Hotel was demolished in the 1780s; a new Polygon Hotel was constructed in Victorian times, which became a notable place to stay in Southampton, with guests including boxer Muhammad Ali, and comedians Tommy Cooper and Morecambe and Wise. Many passengers on the RMS Titanic had stayed here before sailing. The hotel fell into decline, however, and was replaced in 1999 with a block of flats.

Education
There is a secondary school: St Anne's Catholic School, a primary school: Springhill Catholic Primary School, a SEN school: The Polygon School and a language college: Southampton Language College.

Places of interest
St Edmunds Roman Catholic Church
St Marks Church Centre
Romero Halls of Residence
Southampton & New Forest Magistrates
Southampton Courts of Justice
Maritime & Coastguard Agency
Watts Park
Southampton Central railway station
The Polygon Park and Sandhurst Allotments
Bedford Place

References

Areas of Southampton